Asana is a general Indian term for a body position, associated with Indian art, dance and the practice of yoga.
 
Asana may also refer to:

 Asana, Inc., web and mobile collaboration software
 Asana, Peru, an archaeological site by the Asana River
 Asana River, in southern Peru
 Asana Journal, a yoga magazine
 Asana-Math, a font for mathematical notation
 Ya-Asana, a Fijian Island
 Esfenvalerate, a synthetic pyrethroid insecticide
 Melese asana, a moth
 Terminalia elliptica, a tree

People with the given name Asana
 Asana Mamoru (born 1990), Japanese actress